Op.22 Y-Waltz: in Major is the first extended play by South Korean singer Jo Yu-ri. The EP was released by Wake One Entertainment on June 2, 2022, and contains five tracks, including the lead single "Love Shhh!".

Background and release
On May 17, Wake One Entertainment announced Jo Yu-ri would be releasing her first extended play titled Op.22 Y-Waltz: in Major in June 2022. A day later, it was announced that Op.22 Y-Waltz: in Major would be released in June 2 with "Love Shhh!" as the lead single. On May 24, the track listing was released. On May 30, a highlight medley teaser video was released. The music video teaser for "Love Shhh!" was also released on the same day. The EP alongside the music video for "Love Shhh!" was released on June 2.

Commercial performance
Op.22 Y-Waltz: in Major debuted at number five on South Korea's Gaon Album Chart in the chart issue dated May 29 – June 4, 2022.

Promotion
Prior to the extended play's release, on June 2, 2022, Jo Yu-ri held a live event to introduce the EP and communicate with her fans.

Track listing

Charts

Weekly charts

Monthly charts

Release history

References

External links
 

Jo Yu-ri albums
2022 EPs
Korean-language EPs
Stone Music Entertainment EPs
Wake One Entertainment EPs